Weston is a hamlet in the East Hampshire district of Hampshire, England. It is in the civil parish of Buriton.

Notes

Villages in Hampshire